Campiglossa pygmaea is a species of tephritid or fruit flies in the genus Campiglossa of the family Tephritidae.

Distribution
The species is found in Canada, the United States.

References

Tephritinae
Insects described in 1974
Diptera of North America